Badas is a kecamatan (district) in Kediri Regency, East Java Province, Indonesia.  Badas is primarily known for its local fish market, and fish exportation.

Districts of East Java
Kediri Regency